Frăsinet is a commune in Teleorman County, Muntenia, Romania. It is composed of two villages, Clănița and Frăsinet. These were part of Băbăița Commune until 2004, when they were split off.

References

Communes in Teleorman County
Localities in Muntenia